Isaac was one of the patriarchs of the Abrahamic faiths.

Isaac may also refer to:

 Isaac (name), including a list of people and fictional characters with the given name or surname of Isaac and its variants

Organizations
 International Society for Analysis, its Applications and Computation
 International Society for Augmentative and Alternative Communication

Places 
 Great Isaac Cay, Bahamas
 Issac, Dordogne, Nouvelle-Aquitaine, France
 Isaac River, Australia
 Isaac Region, Australia
 Isaac's Harbour, Nova Scotia, Canada
 Isaac's Harbour North, Nova Scotia, Canada
 Port Isaac, Cornwall, United Kingdom

Other uses
 Hurricane Isaac (2012), a Category 1 hurricane that hit the Greater New Orleans area on August 29, 2012
 Infrared Spectrometer And Array Camera (ISAAC)), an instrument on the Very Large Telescope
 ISAAC (cipher), a cryptographically secure pseudorandom number generator
 ISAAC (comics), a supercomputer in Marvel Comics
 Isaac (talk show), a talk show hosted by Isaac Mizrahi
 Tropical Storm Isaac, a designation used for various tropical cyclones
 "Isaac" (song), a song by Hollyn
 "Isaac", a song by Madonna, from her album Confessions on a Dance Floor
 Isaac, the northeasternmost country in the Fire Emblem universe continent Jugdral

See also
 Isaacs (disambiguation)
 Isaaq, a Somali clan
 Ishak (disambiguation)
 ISSAC - International Symposium on Symbolic and Algebraic Computation
 Izak (disambiguation)
 Izzy (disambiguation)
 Zack (disambiguation)